NEAT Domestic Trading Pty Ltd v AWB Ltd was a case before the High Court of Australia which was decided in 2003.

Background 
AWB (a private corporation owned by wheat growers) had been granted a monopoly over the export of wheat in Australia. No other company could export wheat in bulk without the AWB's consent. NEAT Domestic Trading was a grain trader. It requested consent to export wheat and was refused. NEAT then appealed this decision, ultimately to the High Court.

NEAT claimed that AWB was acting in accordance with a rule or policy without regard to the merits of the case, thereby invoking s5(2)(f) and s6(2)(f) of the Judicial Review Act 1977(Cth). The policy in question was that AWB would refuse export permits to other bodies.

Decision 
Gleeson CJ found against NEAT on the grounds that the policy in question was legal, and that no material had been put to AWB that could persuade it to deviate from its policy.

McHugh, Hayne and Callinan JJ held that public law remedies (such as review under the JR Act) were not available against AWB because of the role granted to it under the Act, the private character of AWB, being a company incorporated under corporations legislation and the fact that it was impossible to impose public law obligations on AWB and allow it to pursue its private interests.

Kirby J dissented, holding that the decision was one of an administrative character in the form outlined, and that the decisions at issue were each invalid and void.

See also 

 Administrative law

External links 
 Full text of the decision

High Court of Australia cases
2003 in Australian law
2003 in case law